Andrew Batterley (born 27 November 1976) was an English cricketer. He was a right-handed batsman and right-arm off-break bowler who played for Cheshire. He was born in Leigh, Greater Manchester.

Batterley made two appearances for the team in the 2002 Minor Counties Championship, and a single List A appearance in the C&G Trophy in August 2002.

Between 2003 and 2006,  Batterley played for Leigh in the National Club Championship and later the Cockspur Cup.

External links
Andrew Batterley at Cricket Archive 

1976 births
Living people
English cricketers
Cheshire cricketers
Sportspeople from Leigh, Greater Manchester